Allsvenskan 1993, part of the 1993 Swedish football season, was the 69th Allsvenskan season played. IFK Göteborg won the league ahead of runners-up IFK Norrköping, while Örgryte IS and IK Brage were relegated.

League table

Relegation play-offs

Results

Season statistics

Top scorers

References 

Print
 
 
 

Online
 
 

Allsvenskan seasons
Swed
Swed
1